Bundibugyo District is a district in the Western Region of Uganda, bordering the Democratic Republic of the Congo (DRC). The town of Bundibugyo is where both the district headquarters and the Bwamba Kingdom seat (Obudhingiya Bwa Bwamba) are located.
Before July 2010, the districts of Ntoroko and Bundibugyo were one. These districts are the only two in Uganda that lie west of the Rwenzori mountains. Bundibugyo (With Ntoroko) was first named Semuliki district on separating it from the Greator Kabarole district alongside Rwenzori district (Kasese) in 1974.

Location
 Via Karugutu
Bundibugyo District is bordered by Ntoroko District to the northeast, Kabarole District to the east, Bunyangabu District to the southeast, Kasese District to the south and the D.R.C to the west and north. Or via the D.R.C if they don't fly or walk over the Mountains.

Overview
In the late 1990s, tens of thousands of civilians were displaced by the insurgency of the Allied Democratic Forces (ADF) who were operating in the district. In one such raid on 7 April 1999, rebels killed 11 civilians and looted property during an attack in the district. In a separate attack in the same month, the member of parliament for Bunyangabu county was shot and wounded in an attack in neighboring Kabarole District by ADF insurgents.

Population
The 1991 national population census estimated the district population at 92,300. During the 2002 national census, the population of was put at about 158,900. The annual population growth rate in the district was estimated at 5.2 percent.

In 2012, the population of the district was estimated at 261,700.

Economic activities
Subsistence agriculture and animal husbandry are the two major economic activities in the district. It is the largest producer of cocoa in Uganda, accounting for unprocessed beans worth UGX:90 billion annually.

See also

 Semuliki National Park
 Bundibugyo ebolavirus

References

External links
 Bundibugyo District Information Portal

 
Rwenzururu sub-region
Districts of Uganda
Western Region, Uganda